The Karolinska Institutet Prize for Research in Medical Education is an award bestowed biennially to "recognise and stimulate high-quality research in the field and to promote long-term improvements of educational practices in medical training”. This award has been presented by the Karolinska Institute since 2004 and entails a prize amount of 50,000 Euro.

Prize committee members 
 Chair: Sari Ponzer, Karolinska Institutet
 Scientific secretary: Anna Kiessling, Karolinska Institutet
 Members of the committee:
 Madalena Patricio, University of Lisbon
 Brian Hodges, University of Toronto
 Charlotte Silén, Karolinska Institutet
 Annika Östman Wernerson, Karolinska Institutet
 Bjørn Stensaker, University of Oslo
 Gudrun Edgren, University of Lund
 Ed Peile, University of Warwick

Laureates 
 2004: Henk G. Schmidt, Erasmus University
 2006: Ronald M. Harden, University of Dundee
 2008: Geoffrey R. Norman, McMaster University
 2010: Richard Reznick, Queen's University at Kingston; David Irby, University of California, San Francisco
 2012: Cees van der Vleuten, Maastricht University
 2014: John Norcini, FAIMER
 2016: Brian D. Hodges, University of Toronto
 2018: Lorelei Lingard, University of Western Ontario

External links 
 Official site

References 

Medical education